Landfall is a 1949 British war film directed by Ken Annakin and starring Michael Denison, Patricia Plunkett and Kathleen Harrison. It is based on the 1940 novel Landfall: A Channel Story, written by Nevil Shute.

Synopsis
Rick, a British Coastal Command pilot in World War II based near Portsmouth, sinks what he believes to be a German submarine, unaware that a British submarine is also in that part of the Channel. When it emerges that the British submarine has been lost with all hands, a Navy enquiry is held and the senior naval officer concludes that Rick mistakenly attacked a British submarine in a friendly-fire incident. While the enquiry finds that the captain of the submarine was principally at fault for poor navigation, Rick is officially criticized for having failed to properly visually identify his target. Although his commanding officer disagrees with the court's finding and encourages Rick to stay with the squadron, Rick requests another posting.

Rick's fiancée Mona, a barmaid, overhears information that might help uncover what really happened to the British submarine. She reports this information to the Navy, who re-open the investigation and find that a German submarine torpedoed the British submarine and took its place, running on the surface until it was sunk by Rick.

In the interim, Rick's new posting is a dangerous flying duty, testing a new type of guided bomb. After his aircraft crashes and he is critically injured, he is met at the hospital by the naval captain who originally ruled against him, and he tells Rick that he has been exonerated in the re-opened enquiry.

Cast
 Michael Denison as Rick 
 Patricia Plunkett as Mona 
 Kathleen Harrison as Mona's Mother 
 Denis O'Dea as Captain Burnaby 
 David Tomlinson as Binks 
 Charles Victor as Mona's Father 
 Joan Dowling as Miriam, the Barmaid 
 A. E. Matthews as Air Raid Warden 
 Maurice Denham as Wing Commander Hewitt 
 Margaretta Scott as Mrs. Burnaby 
 Sebastian Shaw as Wing Commander Dickens 
 Nora Swinburne as Admiral's Wife 
 Laurence Harvey as Petty Officer Hooper 
 Paul Carpenter as Petty Officer Morgan 
 Frederick Leister as Admiral Blackett 
 Hubert Gregg as Lieutenant Commander Dale 
 Walter Hudd as Professor Legge
 Margaret Barton as Rosemary – Rick's Sister 
 Edith Sharpe as Mrs. Chambers – Rick's Mother 
 Ivan Samson as Commander Rutherford

Reception
The Radio Times gave the film two out of five stars, calling it a "dainty item from a vanished era of British war movies." TV Guide rated the film similarly, concluding that "[a]dequate performances are marred by a script burdened with some soap opera dramatics."

References

External links

1949 films
British war drama films
British aviation films
British World War II films
Films shot at Associated British Studios
Films directed by Ken Annakin
British black-and-white films
1949 war films
1940s English-language films
1940s British films